{{Infobox martial artist
| name            = Jorge Patino
| image           = 
| image_size      = 200px
| alt             =
| caption         = 
| birth_name      = Jorge Luis Patino
| birth_date      = 
| birth_place     = São Paulo, Brazil
| death_date      = 
| death_place     = 
| death_cause     = 
| other_names     = Macaco (Monkey)
| residence       = Houston, Texas
| nationality     = Brazilian
| height          = 
| weight          = 
| weight_class    = Lightweight  Welterweight  Middleweight
| reach           = 
| style           = 
| stance          = 
| fighting_out_of = São Paulo, Brazil
| team            = Chute Boxe Academy (1996–2007)Gold Team Fighters USA (2010–present)Gold Team Fighters Houston (2008–present)Macaco Gold Team (2001–present)
| trainer         = 
| rank            = 'Fifth degree black belt in Brazilian Jiu-JitsuSecond dan black belt in Judo| years_active    = 1995–present| mma_kowin       = 12
| mma_subwin      = 14
| mma_decwin      = 9
| mma_koloss      = 5
| mma_subloss     = 3
| mma_decloss     = 11
| mma_draw        = 2
| mma_nc          = 2
| occupation      = 
| university      = 
| spouse          = 
| relatives       =
| students        = 
| club            = 
| school          = 
| url             = http://www.goldteamfightersusa.com/  http://www.goldteamtx.com/
| sherdog         = 1015
| footnotes       = 
| updated         = August 22, 2010
}}

Jorge Luis Patino (born May 8, 1973) is a Brazilian professional mixed martial artist currently competing in the Lightweight division. A professional competitor since 1995, Patino has formerly competed in the UFC, PRIDE, Strikeforce, Legacy FC, Jungle Fight, Pancrase, World Series of Fighting, Cage Rage, and Titan FC.

Patino is the BJJ coach of Charles Oliveira and was responsible for awarding Oliveira his black belt.

Background
Originally from São Paulo, Brazil, Patino played rugby and also trained in judo before being introduced to Brazilian jiu-jitsu in 1992, later earning his black belt in 1998. Energetic and hyperactive as a child, Patino earned the nickname Macaco'' (meaning monkey in Portuguese) because of his love for climbing trees.

Mixed martial arts career

Early career
Patino started to compete in vale tudo fights in the year 1995, defeating three opponents in the Circuito de Lutas 1 independent event. Macaco went on a winning track, defeating many opponents, until he was knocked out by João Bosco in Torneio dos Gladiadores 2, his second opponent in the night. Afterwards, Jorge went on to fight in the BVF 6: Campeonato Brasileiro de Vale Tudo 1 event, where he defeated Anderson Lima by knockout, Erico Correia by submissions due to strikes, and then faced José Landi-Jons, also known as Pelé, in a historic battle. After nearly 15 minutes of fighting, Pelé defeated Macaco, making him submit to strikes. The two then had a rematch, which was again won by Landi-Jons.  Patino is managed by Wade Hampel of Big Fight Management.

Fighting abroad
Macaco was then signed to the UFC, where he faced the Welterweight Champion Pat Miletich at UFC 18: The Road to the Heavyweight Title. The champion successfully defended his title, defeating Patino by unanimous decision. Macaco then went on to fight in Japan for the DEEP promotion, drawing a match with Daisuke Ishii. His next two fights happened in Brazil, for the Meca World Vale Tudo promotion, where he faced Gustavo "Ximú" Machado. Jorge had cut his foot while playing soccer, and had to go to the fight still in stitches and bandages. Ximú capitalized on the opportunity, and defeated Patino with a heelhook, later granting a rematch to his opponent. Afterwards, in Meca World Vale Tudo 8, Luiz Cláudio das Dores faced Macaco, but the fight was set as a No Contest due to a bad call by the referee. In 2003, for the first Jungle Fight event, Macaco faced Ronaldo Souza, better known as Jacaré. Patino knocked out Ronaldo in the first round of the fight, which was Jacaré's mixed martial arts debut.

Afterwards, Macaco then returned to Meca, defeating Luiz Brito at Meca World Vale Tudo 10 by a split decision. Afterwards, he fought for the Japanese promotion Pride FC, in its Pride Bushido 3 event, where he faced Kazuo Misaki. Misaki won by unanimous decision, and this was the end of Jorge Patino's stint with PRIDE.

After Nate Moore had to withdraw from his fight against Brazilian Jiu Jitsu world champion André Galvão in Strikeforce, Patino took the fight in short notice for the Strikeforce: Houston event. However, he was defeated in the third round due to strikes.

Legacy Fighting Championship
In his debut with Legacy FC, Patino defeated Pete Spratt via split decision on September 16, 2011 to win the Welterweight Championship at Legacy FC 8.

On December 16, 2011, he fought Mike Bronzoulis and won by unanimous decision (49–46, 49–46, and 49–46), to defend his title in the main event at Legacy FC 9.

On May 11, 2012, Patino dropped to the Lightweight division in order to face Jesus Rivera in the main event of Legacy FC 11, to fight for the vacant Lightweight Championship. However the day before the fight was scheduled to take place, Rivera backed out of the fight and newcomer Clay Hantz took the fight on short notice.  He won the fight via knockout in the first round.  Patino successfully defended the title one time before losing it to Carlos Diego Ferreira in November 2013.

World Series of Fighting
In early 2014, Patino joined the World Series of Fighting organization.  He faced Luis Palomino in his debut WSOF 8 and lost via knockout.

In November 2015, Patino was one of participants of WSOF's one night Lightweight tournament.  He faced Islam Mamedov in the quarterfinals and lost via unanimous decision.  Mamedov, however, was injured and Patino replaced him in the semifinals against Joáo Zeferino.  He lost that fight by submission in the first round.

Personal life
Jorge is married.

Championships and accomplishments
Legacy Fighting Championship
Legacy FC Lightweight Championship (One time, current)
 One successful title defense
Legacy FC Welterweight Championship (One time)
 One successful title defense
Predator Fighting Championship
Predator FC Lightweight Championship (One time)
Max Sport
Max Sport Lightweight Championship (One Time)
Fight Masters Combat
FMC Lightweight Championship (One Time)
Real Fight
Real Fight Lightweight Championship (One Time)
Thunder Fight
Thunder Fight Lightweight Championship (One Time)

Mixed martial arts record

|-
| NC
| align=center| 38–19–2 (2)
| Yousef Wehbe
| NC (overturned)
| BFC - Battlefield: The Great Beginning 
| 
| align=center| 1
| align=center| 4:50
| Seoul, South Korea 
|
|-
|Loss
|align=center| 38–19–2 (1)
| Sabah Homasi
| KO (punch)
| Titan FC 40
| 
| align=center| 2
| align=center| 1:18
| Coral Gables, Florida
|
|-
|Loss
|align=center| 38–18–2 (1)
| Alexander Sarnavskiy
| Decision (unanimous)
| Abu Dhabi Warriors 4
| 
| align=center| 3
| align=center| 5:00
| Abu Dhabi, United Arab Emirates
| 
|-
|Loss
|align=center| 38–17–2 (1)
|João Zeferino
|Submission (heel hook)
| rowspan=2|WSOF 25
| rowspan=2|
|align=center|1
|align=center|1:24
| rowspan=2|Phoenix, Arizona, United States
| 
|-
|Loss
|align=center| 38–16–2 (1)
|Islam Mamedov
|Decision (unanimous)
|align=center|2
|align=center|5:00
| 
|-
|Win
| align=center| 38–15–2 (1)
| Celso Vinicius
| Decision (unanimous)
|Thunder Fight 4
| 
| align=center|5
| align=center|5:00
| São Paulo, Brazil
| 
|-
| Win
| align=center| 37–15–2 (1)
| Sérgio Soares
| KO (punches)
| Real Fight 12
| 
| align=center| 4
| align=center| 4:05
| São Paulo, Brazil
| 
|-
| Win
| align=center| 36–15–2 (1)
| Eric Reynolds
| Decision (unanimous)
| WSOF 15
| 
| align=center| 3
| align=center| 5:00
| Tampa, Florida, United States
|
|-
| Loss
| align=center| 35–15–2 (1)
| Luis Palomino
| KO (punches)
| WSOF 8
| 
| align=center| 2
| align=center| 4:20
| Hollywood, Florida, United States
|
|-
| Win
| align=center| 35–14–2 (1)
| Wagner Campos
| TKO (punches)
| FMC 1: Macaco Galeto
| 
| align=center| 3
| align=center| 2:32
| São Paulo, São Paulo, Brazil
| 
|-
| Loss
| align=center| 34–14–2 (1)
| Carlos Diego Ferreira
| Decision (unanimous)
| Legacy FC 25
| 
| align=center| 5
| align=center| 5:00
| Houston, Texas, United States
| 
|-
| Win
| align=center| 34–13–2 (1)
| Efrain Escudero
| Decision (split)
| Max Sport: 13.2
| 
| align=center| 3
| align=center| 5:00
| Sao Paulo, Brazil
| 
|-
| Draw
| align=center| 33–13–2 (1)
| Isao Kobayashi
| Draw
| Pancrase 246
| 
| align=center| 3
| align=center| 5:00
| Tokyo, Japan
| 
|-
| Win
| align=center| 33–13–1 (1)
| Derrick Krantz
| Submission (triangle guillotine choke)
| Legacy FC 18
| 
| align=center| 2
| align=center| 3:07
| Houston, Texas, United States
| 
|-
| Win
| align=center| 32–13–1 (1)
| Gérson Cordeiro
| Submission (rear-naked choke)
| Predador FC 22
| 
| align=center| 1
| align=center| N/A
| Sao Paulo, Brazil
| 
|-
| Win
| align=center| 31–13–1 (1)
| Clay Hantz
| KO (punches)
| Legacy FC 11
| 
| align=center| 1
| align=center| 1:04
| Houston, Texas, United States
| 
|-
| Win
| align=center| 30–13–1 (1)
| Mike Bronzoulis
| Decision (unanimous)
| Legacy FC 9
| 
| align=center| 5
| align=center| 5:00
| Houston, Texas, United States
| 
|-
| Win
| align=center| 29–13–1 (1)
| Pete Spratt
| Decision (split)
| Legacy FC 8
| 
| align=center| 5
| align=center| 5:00
| Houston, Texas, United States
| 
|-
| Win
| align=center| 28–13–1 (1)
| Cleburn Walker
| Submission (neck crank)
| Quality Entertainment
| 
| align=center| 1
| align=center| 3:57
| Austin, Texas, United States
| 
|-
| Loss
| align=center| 27–13–1 (1)
| André Galvão
| TKO (punches)
| Strikeforce: Houston
| 
| align=center| 3
| align=center| 2:45
| Houston, Texas, United States
| 
|-
| Loss
| align=center| 27–12–1 (1)
| Roan Carneiro
| Decision (unanimous)
| Shine Fights 2: ATT vs. The World
| 
| align=center| 3
| align=center| 5:00
| Miami, Florida, United States
| 
|-
| Win
| align=center| 27–11–1 (1)
| Beau Baker
| Decision (unanimous)
| KAP: The Return of Macaco
| 
| align=center| 3
| align=center| 5:00
| Newark, New Jersey, United States
| 
|-
| Loss
| align=center| 26–11–1 (1)
| Kyacey Uscola
| Decision (unanimous)
| PFP: Ring of Fire
| 
| align=center| 3
| align=center| 5:00
| Manila, Philippines
| 
|-
| Win
| align=center| 26–10–1 (1)
| Gustavo Machado
| Decision (split)
| Predador FC 6: Octagon
| 
| align=center| 3
| align=center| 5:00
| São Paulo, Brazil
| 
|-
| Loss
| align=center| 25–10–1 (1)
| Luis Santos
| Decision (unanimous)
| Midway Fight
| 
| align=center| 3
| align=center| 5:00
| São Paulo, Brazil
| 
|-
| Loss
| align=center| 25–9–1 (1)
| Fernando Pontes
| Decision (unanimous)
| Showfight 5
| 
| align=center| 3
| align=center| 5:00
| São Paulo, Brazil
| 
|-
| Win
| align=center| 25–8–1 (1)
| Roberto Godoi
| TKO (punches)
| Super Challenge 1
| 
| align=center| 2
| align=center| 5:00
| Barueri, Brazil
| 
|-
| Win
| align=center| 24–8–1 (1)
| Curtis Stout
| Decision (unanimous)
| Cage Rage 16
| 
| align=center| 3
| align=center| 5:00
| London, England
| 
|-
| Loss
| align=center| 23–8–1 (1)
| Eduardo Pamplona
| Decision (unanimous)
| Showfight 4
| 
| align=center| 3
| align=center| 5:00
| São Paulo, Brazil
| 
|-
| Win
| align=center| 23–7–1 (1)
| Gabriel Vella
| KO (punches)
| Showfight 3
| 
| align=center| 1
| align=center| 1:40
| São Paulo, Brazil
| 
|-
| Win
| align=center| 22–7–1 (1)
| Carlos Baruch
| TKO (punches)
| Jungle Fight 4
| 
| align=center| 2
| align=center| 3:57
| Manaus, Brazil
| 
|-
| Win
| align=center| 21–7–1 (1)
| Boris Jonstomp
| Submission (arm-triangle choke)
| Jungle Fight 3
| 
| align=center| 2
| align=center| N/A
| Manaus, Brazil
| 
|-
| Loss
| align=center| 20–7–1 (1)
| Delson Heleno
| Decision (unanimous)
| Meca World Vale Tudo 11
| 
| align=center| 3
| align=center| 5:00
| Teresópolis, Brazil
| 
|-
| Loss
| align=center| 20–6–1 (1)
| Kazuo Misaki
| Decision (unanimous)
| Pride Bushido 3
| 
| align=center| 2
| align=center| 5:00
| Yokohama, Japan
| 
|-
| Win
| align=center| 20–5–1 (1)
| Luis Brito
| Decision (split)
| Meca World Vale Tudo 10
| 
| align=center| 3
| align=center| 5:00
| Curitiba, Brazil
| 
|-
| Win
| align=center| 19–5–1 (1)
| Ronaldo Souza
| KO (punch)
| Jungle Fight 1
| 
| align=center| 1
| align=center| 3:13
| Manaus, Brazil
| 
|-
| NC
| align=center| 18–5–1 (1)
| Luiz Claudio das Dores
| NC (premature stoppage)
| Meca World Vale Tudo 8
| 
| align=center| 1
| align=center| 4:36
| Curitiba, Brazil
| 
|-
| Loss
| align=center| 18–5–1
| Gustavo Machado
| Submission (heel hook)
| Meca World Vale Tudo 6 - BTT vs. PAP
| 
| align=center| 1
| align=center| 2:00
| Curitiba, Brazil
| 
|-
| Draw
| align=center| 18–4–1
| Daisuke Ishii
| Draw
| Deep: 1st Impact
| 
| align=center| 3
| align=center| 5:00
| Nagoya, Japan
| 
|-
| Loss
| align=center| 18–4
| Pat Miletich
| Decision (unanimous)
| UFC 18
| 
| align=center| 1
| align=center| 21:00
| New Orleans, Louisiana, United States
| 
|-
| Loss
| align=center| 18–3
| José Landi-Jons
| TKO (doctor stoppage)
| World Vale Tudo Championship 4
| 
| align=center| 1
| align=center| 9:37
| Brazil
| 
|-
| Loss
| align=center| 18–2
| José Landi-Jons
| TKO (submission to punches)
| BVF 6: Campeonato Brasileiro de Vale Tudo 1
| 
| align=center| 1
| align=center| 14:19
| Brazil
| 
|-
| Win
| align=center| 18–1
| Erico Correia
| Submission (armbar)
| BVF 6: Campeonato Brasileiro de Vale Tudo 1
| 
| align=center| 1
| align=center| 0:47
| Brazil
| 
|-
| Win
| align=center| 17–1
| Anderson Lima
| KO (punches)
| BVF 6: Campeonato Brasileiro de Vale Tudo 1
| 
| align=center| 1
| align=center| 0:50
| Brazil
| 
|-
| Loss
| align=center| 16–1
| João Bosco
| KO (punches)
| Torneio dos Gladiadores 2
| 
| align=center| 1
| align=center| 0:33
| Brazil
| 
|-
| Win
| align=center| 16–0
| Carlos Arantes
| TKO (punches)
| Tournament of Gladiators 2
| 
| align=center| 1
| align=center| 1:20
| Brazil
| 
|-
| Win
| align=center| 15–0
| João João 
| TKO (punches)
| Tournament of Gladiators 2
| 
| align=center| 1
| align=center| 0:17
| Brazil
| 
|-
| Win
| align=center| 14–0
| Claudio Neves
| Submission (rear-naked choke)
| Tournament of Gladiators 1
| 
| align=center| 1
| align=center| 3:50
| Sao Paulo, Brazil
| 
|-
| Win
| align=center| 13–0
| Antônio Pedra
| Submission (americana)
| Tournament of Gladiators 1
| 
| align=center| 1
| align=center| 2:19
| Sao Paulo, Brazil
| 
|-
| Win
| align=center| 12–0
| Reinaldo Chagas
| TKO (elbows)
| Tournament of Gladiators 1
| 
| align=center| 1
| align=center| 0:59
| Sao Paulo, Brazil
| 
|-
| Win
| align=center| 11–0
| Pedro Leão 
| TKO (doctor stoppage)
| Free Stile de Natal: Natal Freestyle 1
| 
| align=center| 1
| align=center| 6:14
| Rio Grande Do Norte, Brazil
| 
|-
| Win
| align=center| 10–0
| Kiko Boxe
| TKO (punches)
| Free Stile de Natal: Natal Freestyle 1
| 
| align=center| 1
| align=center| 0:48
| Rio Grande Do Norte, Brazil
| 
|-
| Win
| align=center| 9–0
| Sílvio Karate
| Submission (guillotine choke)
| Free Stile de Natal: Natal Freestyle 1
| 
| align=center| 1
| align=center| 0:29
| Rio Grande Do Norte, Brazil
| 
|-
| Win
| align=center| 8–0
| Ivo dos Reis
| TKO (submission to punches)
| Circuito de Lutas 3
| 
| align=center| 1
| align=center| 1:01
| Sao Paulo, Brazil
| 
|-
| Win
| align=center| 7–0
| Guaracy Pereira
| TKO (submission to punches)
| Circuito de Lutas 3
| 
| align=center| 1
| align=center| 1:07
| Sao Paulo, Brazil
| 
|-
| Win
| align=center| 6–0
| Claudionor Cardoso da Silva
| Submission (triangle choke)
| Circuito de Lutas 2
| 
| align=center| 1
| align=center| 3:06
| Sao Paulo, Brazil
| 
|-
| Win
| align=center| 5–0
| José de Campos
| Submission (rear-naked choke)
| Circuito de Lutas 2
| 
| align=center| 1
| align=center| 0:57
| Sao Paulo, Brazil
| 
|-
| Win
| align=center| 4–0
| Paulo de Jesus
| TKO (submission to punches)
| Circuito de Lutas 2
| 
| align=center| 1
| align=center| 0:27
| Sao Paulo, Brazil
| 
|-
| Win
| align=center| 3–0
| Claudionor Cardoso da Silva
| Submission (armbar)
| Circuito de Lutas 1
| 
| align=center| 1
| align=center| 0:28
| Sao Paulo, Brazil
| 
|-
| Win
| align=center| 2–0
| Ricardo Antiorio
| TKO (submission to punches)
| Circuito de Lutas 1
| 
| align=center| 1
| align=center| 0:27
| Sao Paulo, Brazil
| 
|-
| Win
| align=center| 1–0
| Dulcino Silva
| Submission (rear-naked choke)
| Circuito de Lutas 1
| 
| align=center| 1
| align=center| 0:16
| Sao Paulo, Brazil
|

See also

Vale Tudo
Brazilian Jiu Jitsu
List of male mixed martial artists

References

External links
 
 

 Official site

Living people
1973 births
Brazilian male mixed martial artists
Welterweight mixed martial artists
Middleweight mixed martial artists
Mixed martial artists utilizing Brazilian jiu-jitsu
Mixed martial artists utilizing judo
Brazilian practitioners of Brazilian jiu-jitsu
People awarded a black belt in Brazilian jiu-jitsu
Brazilian male judoka
Sportspeople from São Paulo
Brazilian people of Spanish descent
Brazilian jiu-jitsu trainers
Ultimate Fighting Championship male fighters